The Midwest Counties Female Football League is a women's association football league in England. The competition covers the counties of Herefordshire, Shropshire and Worcestershire. The league consists of three adult divisions. It is at level 7 of the women's pyramid. It promotes to the West Midlands Regional Women's Football League Division One, and does not relegate to any league. Matches are played on Sundays.

Teams
The teams competing during the 2022-23 season are:

Division One
 Areley Kings Ladies
 Bromsgrove Sporting Ladies
 Cradley Town D C Ladies
 Hereford Ladies
 Inkberrow Eagles Ladies 
 Kidderminster United Women 
 Ludlow Town Ladies
 Malvern Town FC Women
 Meadow Park Women
 TDMS Ladies
 Ross Juniors Women
 Welland Ladies
 Wyre Forest Phoenix Ladies

References

External links
Midwest Counties Female Football League

7
Football in Herefordshire
Football in Shropshire
Football in Worcestershire
2009 establishments in England
Sports leagues established in 2009